A hard candy (American English), or boiled sweet (British English), is a sugar candy prepared from one or more sugar-based syrups that is heated to a temperature of 160 °C (320 °F) to make candy.  Among the many hard candy varieties are stick candy such as the candy cane, lollipops, rock, aniseed twists, and bêtises de Cambrai. "Boiled" is a misnomer, as sucrose (a disaccharide) melts fully at approximately 186 °C.  Further heating breaks it into glucose and fructose molecules before it can vaporize.

Most hard candy is nearly 100% sugar by weight, with a tiny amount of other ingredients for color or flavor, and negligible water content in the final product. Recipes for hard candy may use syrups of sucrose, glucose, fructose or other sugars.  Sugar-free versions have also been created.

Creation

Recipes for hard candy use a sugar syrup, such as sucrose, glucose or fructose. This is heated to a particular temperature, at which point the candy maker removes it from the heat source and may add citric acid, food dye, and some flavouring, such as a plant extract, essential oil, or flavourant. The syrup concoction, which is now very thick, can be poured into a mold or tray to cool, or a cooling table in case of industrial mass production. When the syrup is cool enough to handle, it can be folded, rolled, or molded into the shapes desired. After the boiled syrup cools, it is called hard candy, since it becomes stiff and brittle as it approaches room temperature.

Chemistry
Chemically, sugar candies are broadly divided into two groups: crystalline candies and amorphous candies. Crystalline candies are not as hard as crystals of the mineral variety, but derive their name and their texture from their microscopically organized sugar structure, formed through a process of crystallization, which makes them easy to bite or cut into. Amorphous candies have a disorganized crystalline structure.  Hard candies are non-crystalline, amorphous candies containing about 98% (or more) solid sugar.

Medicinal use 

Hard candies are historically associated with cough drops. The extended flavor release of lozenge-type candy, which mirrors the properties of modern cough drops, had long been appreciated. Many apothecaries used sugar candy to make their prescriptions more palatable to their customers.
They are also carried by people with hypoglycemia to quickly raise their low blood sugar level which, when untreated, can sometimes lead to fainting and other physical complications, and are used as part of diabetic management.

Sugar-free 
Hard candies and throat lozenges prepared without sugar employ isomalt as a sugar substitute, and are sweetened further by the addition of an artificial sweetener, such as aspartame, sucralose, saccharin, or a sugar alcohol, such as xylitol.

See also

 Candy making
 Confectionery
 Humbug (sweet)
 Pear drop
 Mint (candy)
 Gumdrop
 Pastille

Confectioners of boiled sweets
John Millar & Sons
Jolly Rancher (now a division of The Hershey Company)
Maxons Ltd, manufacturer of Black Bullets

Notes

References

Candy

sv:Karamell